The 1998 Cairns Cyclones season was the third season that the Cairns Cyclones rugby league team competed in the Queensland Cup. The Queensland Cup became the premier level competition in the state in 1998 after the Brisbane Rugby League ceased at the end of the 1997 season. See Article: Brisbane Rugby League.

The Cyclones were one of sixteen clubs competing in the twenty-two-week-long competition. The Bundaberg Grizzlies re-joined the competition, the Townsville Stingers and Gold Coast Vikings joined for the first time and the Port Moresby Vipers left due to travel and accommodation costs. The Cairns Cyclones team was managed by Nigel Tillett and coached by Gary Smith.

1998 Queensland Cup

1998 Cairns Cyclones Squad 

Jason Barsley
Phil Yanner
Sterling Fourmile
Duncn Naawi
Rober David
Karl Dawson
Noel Haslem
John Bolsem
Brian Balderson
Wes Davies
Paul Ketchell
Colin Prince
Steve Singleton
Brett Blennerhassett
Swaggie Nona
Shane Medhurst
Nathan Butterworth

1998 Ladder

1998 Channel Nine Cup Minor Premiers and Premiers

Minor Premiers:  Norths Devils
Premiers:  Norths Devils

1998 Cairns Cyclones Matches

Rugby league in Queensland